Schwarzach im Pongau is a market town in the St. Johann im Pongau District in the Austrian state of Salzburg.

Geography
It is located in the valley of the Salzach river, between the Hohe Tauern mountain range (Goldberg and Ankogel groups) in the south and the Salzburg Slate Alps in the north. The municipal area is quite small, enclosed by the neighbouring municipalities of Sankt Veit and Goldegg.

History
Schwarzach in the Archbishopric of Salzburg was first mentioned in a 1074 deed. Schernberg Castle west of the town centre, a 12th-century fortress, was purchased by Archbishop Friedrich von Schwarzenberg in 1845 and turned into the site of a brewery (Brauerei Schwarzach). Soon after, the business was relocated to Schwarzach centre and the castle was converted into a charitable mental hospital run by the Daughters of Charity. During the Austrian Anschluss to Nazi Germany from 1938 to 1945, the Daughters fought against compulsory sterilization and the Action T4 "euthanasia" programme, but could not save their patients.

In 1875, Schwarzach received access to the Salzburg-Tyrol Railway line (Giselabahn), running from the city of Salzburg through the Salzach valley to Wörgl in Tyrol, which decisively promoted the local economy. With the opening of the Tauern Railway across the Central Eastern Alps to Spittal an der Drau in Carinthia, the station became an important railway junction. Schwarzach was split off the Sankt Veit municipality in 1906 and received market rights two years later.

Notable people
 Adolf Krischanitz (born 1946), architect
 Patrick Reiter (born 1972), retired judoka
 Stefan Obermaier (born 1981), musician
 Andrea Fischbacher (born 1985), alpine skier, olympic champion
 Michaela Kirchgasser (born 1985), alpine skier
 Marco Salvatore (born 1986), football player
 Iris Strubegger (born 1984), fashion model
 Stefan Kraft (born 1993), ski jumper 
 The author Thomas Bernhard (1931–1989), suffering from tuberculosis had to spend much time in the area as a patient at the sanatorium in nearby Sankt Veit. He made Schwarzach the setting of his first novel Frost published in 1963.
 Giuliana Olmos, Mexican tennis player

References

Cities and towns in St. Johann im Pongau District